Buried Secrets is the second EP by American band Painkiller originally released by Toy's Factory in Japan and Earache in the UK, featuring guest appearances from Justin Broadrick and G. C. Green from Godflesh. Broadrick described the release as the result of various jams and improvisational sessions.

Reception

The AllMusic review by Steve Huey states "Although this is experimental music, it works quite well — it's actually more sinister and menacing than many death metal groups. Very dark and very disturbing, 27 minutes is almost too much to handle."

Track listing

Personnel 
 John Zorn – alto saxophone, vocals
 Bill Laswell – bass
 Mick Harris – drums, vocals
 Justin Broadrick – guitar, drum machine, vocals on "Buried Secrets" and "The Toll"
 G. C. Green – bass on "Buried Secrets" and "The Toll"

References 

1992 EPs
Painkiller (band) albums
Albums produced by John Zorn
Earache Records EPs